Frederick Thomas Bertrand Gibson (8 December 1888 – 15 March 1952) was a South African professional footballer who played as an outside left for several clubs in Scotland and England including Sunderland, Raith Rovers (playing in the 1913 Scottish Cup Final), Heart of Midlothian and Coventry City.

References

1888 births
1952 deaths
People from Thaba Chweu Local Municipality
South African Republic people
South African soccer players
Association football outside forwards
Bedworth United F.C. players
Sunderland Royal Rovers F.C. players
Sunderland A.F.C. players
Raith Rovers F.C. players
Dunfermline Athletic F.C. players
Heart of Midlothian F.C. players
Coventry City F.C. players
Nuneaton Borough F.C. players
Atherstone Town F.C. players
English Football League players
Scottish Football League players